In statistics, sufficient dimension reduction (SDR) is a paradigm for analyzing data that combines the ideas of dimension reduction with the concept of sufficiency.

Dimension reduction has long been a primary goal of regression analysis.

In other words, no information about the regression is lost in reducing the dimension of  if the reduction is sufficient.

Graphical motivation 
In a regression setting, it is often useful to summarize the distribution of  graphically. For instance, one may consider a scatter plot of  versus one or more of the predictors. A scatter plot that contains all available regression information is called a sufficient summary plot.

When  is high-dimensional, particularly when , it becomes increasingly challenging to construct and visually interpret sufficiency summary plots without reducing the data. Even three-dimensional scatter plots must be viewed via a computer program, and the third dimension can only be visualized by rotating the coordinate axes. However, if there exists a sufficient dimension reduction  with small enough dimension, a sufficient summary plot of  versus  may be constructed and visually interpreted with relative ease.

The rest of this article deals only with such reductions.

Dimension reduction subspace 
Suppose  is a sufficient dimension reduction, where  is a  matrix with rank .

Without loss of generality, only the space spanned by the columns of  need be considered. It follows from the definition of a sufficient dimension reduction that

 

where  denotes the appropriate distribution function. Another way to express this property is

 

Then the subspace  is defined to be a dimension reduction subspace (DRS).

Structural dimensionality 
The corresponding DRS will be d-dimensional.

Minimum dimension reduction subspace 

If  has basis  and is a minimum DRS, then a plot of y versus  is a minimal sufficient summary plot, and it is (d + 1)-dimensional.

Central subspace 
In other words, a central subspace for  exists if and only if the intersection  of all dimension reduction subspaces is also a dimension reduction subspace, and that intersection is the central subspace .

The central subspace  does not necessarily exist because the intersection  is not necessarily a DRS. However, if  does exist, then it is also the unique minimum dimension reduction subspace.

Existence of the central subspace 
While the existence of the central subspace  is not guaranteed in every regression situation, there are some rather broad conditions under which its existence follows directly. For example, consider the following proposition from Cook (1998):

If  has density  for all  and  everywhere else, where  is convex, then the intersection  is also a dimension reduction subspace.

It follows from this proposition that the central subspace  exists for such .

Methods for dimension reduction 
There are many existing methods for dimension reduction, both graphical and numeric. For example, sliced inverse regression (SIR) and sliced average variance estimation (SAVE) were introduced in the 1990s and continue to be widely used. Although SIR was originally designed to estimate an effective dimension reducing subspace, it is now understood that it estimates only the central subspace, which is generally different.

More recent methods for dimension reduction include likelihood-based sufficient dimension reduction, estimating the central subspace based on the inverse third moment (or kth moment), estimating the central solution space, graphical regression, envelope model, and the principal support vector machine. For more details on these and other methods, consult the statistical literature.

Principal components analysis (PCA) and similar methods for dimension reduction are not based on the sufficiency principle.

Example: linear regression 
Consider the regression model

 

The plot of  versus  is a sufficient summary plot for this regression.

See also 
Dimension reduction
Sliced inverse regression
Principal component analysis
Linear discriminant analysis
Curse of dimensionality
Multilinear subspace learning

Notes

References 

Cook, R.D. (1998) Regression Graphics: Ideas for Studying Regressions through Graphics, Wiley Series in Probability and Statistics. Regression Graphics.
Cook, R.D. and Adragni, K.P. (2009) "Sufficient Dimension Reduction and Prediction in Regression", Philosophical Transactions of the Royal Society A: Mathematical, Physical and Engineering Sciences, 367(1906), 4385–4405. Full-text
Cook, R.D. and Weisberg, S. (1991) "Sliced Inverse Regression for Dimension Reduction: Comment", Journal of the American Statistical Association, 86(414), 328–332. Jstor
Li, K-C. (1991) "Sliced Inverse Regression for Dimension Reduction", Journal of the American Statistical Association, 86(414), 316–327. Jstor

External links 
 Sufficient Dimension Reduction

Dimension reduction